Viva la Muerte (English: either "Long Live Death" or "Live the Death") may refer to:

 Viva la muerte (film), by Fernando Arrabal
 Viva la Muerte (Cobra Verde album), 1994
 Viva la Muerte (Inkubus Sukkubus album), 2008

See also
 Long Live Death (disambiguation)
 Miguel de Unamuno § Confrontation with Millán Astray
 José Millán-Astray § Confrontation with Unamuno